Rigney is a commune in the Doubs department in the Bourgogne-Franche-Comté region in eastern France. Its hamlet La Roche-sur-l'Ognon is also the most likely place of origin of the first ducal family of the Duchy of Athens, the de la Roche family.

Population

See also
 Communes of the Doubs department

References

Communes of Doubs